is an anime producer and animator. He worked for the animation studio Topcraft, where Hayao Miyazaki and Isao Takahata worked immediately before forming Studio Ghibli in 1985.

Productions
Flanders no Inu (production direction)
High School! Kimengumi (producer)
The Last Unicorn (assistant animation supervisor)
Nausicaä of the Valley of the Wind (production supervisor)

External links
 Japan Movie Database
 
 A Dog of Flanders credits

Living people
Japanese animators
Japanese animated film producers
Japanese television producers
Year of birth missing (living people)